Kim Hak-sung (born February 28, 1968) is a professional wheelchair curler from South Korea.He lost his function of his lower body due to an industrial hazard while working as a construction worker in 1991. He is the skip for the South Korean team at the 2010 Winter Paralympics. He graduated from Seoul Institute of the Arts. In addition to wheelchair curling, he has represented South Korea in both javelin, discus throw and shot put. His hobbies are internet gaming, fishing, and wheelchair basketball. His home wheelchair curling club is Wonju Yonsei Dream located in Gangwon.

References

External links

Profile at the Official Website for the 2010 Winter Paralympics in Vancouver

1968 births
Living people
Paralympic wheelchair curlers of South Korea
South Korean male curlers
South Korean wheelchair curlers
Wheelchair curlers at the 2010 Winter Paralympics
Place of birth missing (living people)
Medalists at the 2010 Winter Paralympics
Paralympic silver medalists for South Korea
Paralympic medalists in wheelchair curling